Moonwink is the sixth studio album by The Spinto Band. It was released on October 7, 2008 in North America and September 22, 2008 worldwide. It leaked onto various p2p sites on August 7.

Track listing

Release history

References

2008 albums
The Spinto Band albums
Albums produced by Tchad Blake